Lentilactobacillus parakefiri is a species in the genus Lentilactobacillus first isolated from kefir grains, hence its name. Its type strain is GCL 1731 (= JCM 8573).

References

Further reading
Ljungh, Åsa, and Torkel Wadström, eds. Lactobacillus molecular biology: from genomics to probiotics. Horizon Scientific Press, 2009.

External links

LPSN
Type strain of Lactobacillus parakefiri at BacDive -  the Bacterial Diversity Metadatabase

Lactobacillaceae
Bacteria described in 1994